"Mantra" (often stylized in all caps) is a song by British rock band Bring Me the Horizon. Produced by the band's vocalist Oliver Sykes and keyboardist Jordan Fish, it is featured on the group's 2019 sixth studio album Amo. The track was released as the first single from the album on 21 August 2018, topping the UK Rock & Metal Singles Chart and spending three weeks at that spot.

Promotion and release
Bring Me the Horizon released "Mantra" as their first new material since That's the Spirit on 21 August 2018, the day before the band's sixth studio album Amo was announced. The song was originally teased with a promotional campaign including a billboard in London, which featured the lyric "Do you wanna start a cult with me?" The billboard also contained a phone number that contained a sample of the track, and the website joinmantra.com was set up to reveal the single's release date. The group performed the track live for the first time at Reading Festival on 23 August, followed by a performance at Leeds Festival the following day.

Composition and lyrics
"Mantra" has been described as a hard rock, alternative rock, electronic rock, pop rock, and pop metal song. Speaking to music magazine Metal Hammer, vocalist Oliver Sykes revealed that "Mantra" was inspired by Wild Wild Country, a documentary about controversial Indian guru Bhagwan Shree Rajneesh, explaining that "As I was watching it and trying to write lyrics at the same time, I was drawing these similarities to cults and love." Moving on to speak about the lyrics, he added that "Starting a relationship – especially a marriage – is like starting a cult, a small two-man cult, because you have to give yourself over completely to this person, you have to trust them, you have to love them unconditionally ... so that's where the thinking behind the song came from".

Musically, "Mantra" is described by NME writer Tom Connick as featuring "a twisted, glitchy electronica intro" followed by a "festival-headline-baiting chorus", contributing to a sound that he claims is "built for huge stages". Connick goes on to claim that the electronic elements of the song "add atmosphere".

Music video
The music video for "Mantra" was released on 24 August 2018, three days after the song was first made available. According to music website Consequence of Sound, the video "depicts frontman Oli Sykes as a cult leader, as his followers hang on his every word". Revolver magazine's John Hill outlined that "The visuals in the video clash repeatedly, elements of video games, late-night infomercials, and church sermons all run on a closed loop next to each other for a vicious effect", describing it as "crazy". Similarly, Emmy Mack of Music Feeds dubbed the video "batshit crazy".

Reception

Critical
Tom Connick of the NME praised "Mantra" as "an inventive cut of ballsy, bluesy modern rock, fit for stadiums and headline slots", highlighting the electronic elements of the song and the vocal performance of Oliver Sykes. Axl Rosenberg of MetalSucks criticised the song, calling it "drek" and joking, "If you hate everyone in your immediate vicinity, turn your speakers way up and crank "Mantra"."

Accolades
In 2019, "Mantra" was nominated for the Best Rock Song category at the 61st Grammy Awards and was also nominated for Best Song at the Kerrang! Awards.

Personnel
Credits adapted from Tidal.

Bring Me the Horizon
 Oliver Sykes – lead vocals, production, composition
 Lee Malia – guitars, composition
 Matt Kean – bass, composition
 Matt Nicholls – drums, composition
 Jordan Fish – keyboards, synthesizers, programming, percussion, backing vocals, production, composition

Additional personnel
 Romesh Dodangoda – engineering
 Ted Jensen – mastering
 Dan Lancaster – mixing

In popular culture
 "Mantra" is featured on the soundtrack for the 2020 video game Watch Dogs: Legion.
"Mantra" was played during an episode of MTV's 34th season of The Challenge.

Charts

Weekly charts

Year-end charts

Certifications

Cover versions
In 2020, Japanese girl group Passcode covered the song on their official YouTube channel.

References

2018 singles
2018 songs
Bring Me the Horizon songs
RCA Records singles
Songs written by Oliver Sykes
Sony Music singles